A batarang is a roughly bat-shaped throwing weapon used by the DC Comics superhero Batman. The name is a portmanteau of bat and boomerang, and was originally spelled baterang. Although they are named after boomerangs, batarangs have become more like shuriken in recent interpretations. They have since become a staple of Batman's arsenal, appearing in every major Batman television and film adaptation to date. Recent interpretations of the Dark Knight find additional motivation to use the batarang as a ranged attack (alternative to firearms, which he rejects outright due to the circumstances of his parents' murder, except for certain circumstances) and is used primarily to knock guns out of an assailant's hand.

A Batarang prop from the 1997 film Batman & Robin has been donated to the Smithsonian Institution, and is in the National Museum of American History's entertainment collection.

History 
Batarangs first appeared in Detective Comics #31 (September 1939), in the story "Batman Versus the Vampire". Batman threw the first batarang at the Monk and missed, but later in the story, the batarang helped him knock over a chandelier and escape from the villain's trap.

The earliest depictions were of scalloped, metal boomerangs used to attack opponents, which quickly flew back to the thrower. However, variations of batarangs include those that can fold to fit into Batman's utility belt, those that can be explosively charged, those that can be remote-controlled, and those that are electrified.

The use of the batarang has been in a state of constant development since its early appearances. In 1946, Batman and Robin developed a "batarang gun", and then a lighter "batarang pistol" in 1947. A 1957 story called "The 100 Batarangs of Batman!" (Detective Comics #244, June 1957) detailed the magnetic batarang, the seeing-eye batarang, the flash-bulb batarang, the bomb batarang, the rope batarang, the police whistle batarang and the mysterious Batarang X, among others.  That issue also included an "origin story" for the batarang, which was given to Batman by an Australian circus performer named Lee Collins.

After the 1985-1986 Crisis on Infinite Earths, Batman developed smaller batarangs with sharp edges that could disarm criminals. According to The Essential Batman Encyclopedia, "The most consistently used versions of the Batarang included ones with micro-serrated edges; a hard-impact version for stunning criminals; a remote-controlled one linked to his Utility Belt; and an aerodynamically edged model with a throwing top."

A rifle-like grappling gun first appeared in Frank Miller's Batman: The Dark Knight Returns #1. However, the now standard hand-held version of Batman's grappling gun first appeared in the 1989 Batman film. It gradually replaced the batarang and a rope in the comics after artist Norm Breyfogle introduced a grapple gun in Batman #458 in January 1991. That tool became the standard in the subsequent animated series, comics, films, and video games such as Batman: Arkham Asylum and in Batman: Arkham City a more advanced version called the Grapnel was introduced which could be used to launch Batman into the air to glide using kinetic energy.

A Batarang prop from the 1997 film Batman & Robin has been donated to the Smithsonian Institution, and is in the National Museum of American History's entertainment collection. It was donated by Warner Bros. studio chairman Barry Meyer in 2013, along with other famous movie props including a golden ticket from 2005's Charlie and the Chocolate Factory and models from the 1995 film Gremlins 2: The New Batch.

Other characters and versions
Batgirl also uses batarangs. Nightwing, a former Robin, is known to use his own modified batarangs called Wing-Dings, which are styled after a bird. Tim Drake, the third Robin, also possesses his own 'R'-shaped shuriken.  In an issue of Teen Titans (Vol. 3), Drake claims that he hid the costs for shipping a Batmobile from Gotham City to San Francisco in "the batarang budget", which he tells the others is "bigger than you might think". The current version of Batwoman uses foldable S-shaped throwing weapons stored in two sets of three on her gauntlets; these can be removed and thrown by hand, launched pneumatically, or used as forearm-mounted blades. Catman also uses weapons inspired by Batman's and calls them "catarangs". Like Robin, Anarky, an occasional antagonist of Batman, also makes use of shuriken formed after his own gimmick, the "circle-a".

A Throwing Bird—colloquially referred to as a "Birdarang"—is a roughly bird-shaped throwing weapon used by the DC Comics superhero Robin as a non-lethal ranged attack alternative to firearms. As with Batman, Robin can launch his weapon with a launcher located on his lower arm. They are also used by Robin in non-Batman media such as Teen Titans Go! where they appear under the name Birdarangs.

Ken Washio (the eagle) from the 1972 anime series Science Ninja Team Gatchaman (Battle of the Planets) also use Birdarangs.

In other media

Live-action television
In the movie adaptations of Batman, the batarangs shown roughly match the adapted bat logo of the respective movie franchise. Following the backlash against the camp Batman television series, the franchise has avoided falling into the perceived overuse of the bat- prefix, for which the 1960s series was criticized. Though featured prominently, the batarangs are very rarely referred to by name, unlike the Batcave and Batmobile.

The television series Birds of Prey also features batarangs. However these versions are circular and bear the Birds of Prey symbol, rather than the traditional bat shape.

In the episode "Nothing's Shocking" from the fifth and final season of Gotham, Bruce Wayne uses sharp objects and throws them at an enemy similar to the batarangs, foreshadowing their full appearance later in the season. The batarangs officially appear in the series finale "The Beginning...". In the episode, Batman uses his batarangs to defeat Jeremiah Valeska at Ace Chemicals.

Kate used the batarangs in the television series Batwoman.

Live-action films
The batarang used in Batman was a foldable metal bat attached to a line and was used to ensnare an enemy's legs and manually drag them back. Batman Returns also featured a computerized version that could be programmed to fly after specific targets. Batman Forever featured two types of batarangs: one with a string which catches one of Two-Face's thugs in the Gotham City bank and a "Sonar Batarang" that uses the "Sonar Suit" to destroy the Super Box and the Nygmatech building. Other batarangs are seen in the Batcave, along with the one used in Batman Returns but not used during the movie. Batarangs also appeared in Batman and Robin.

The Dark Knight trilogy
The 2005 film Batman Begins showed them as a simple bat-shaped shuriken, used mainly for distraction rather than as weapons, fitting in with that film's depiction of Batman's ninja training.

While The Dark Knight uses the batarang in its promotional posters, it is not thrown in the film. As part of Lucius Fox's improvements on the Batsuit, he adds blades on the suit that shoot out of Batman's arm, which are similar to the batarang. To gain leverage over his fight with the Joker, Batman shoots these blades at him, distracting him and giving Batman the upper hand. His true batarangs are only seen once during the film; when Bruce Wayne puts away his Batsuit after deciding to turn himself in to the police, he takes a minute to pick up and stare at one of his batarangs, and then proceeds to put it away with the rest of his gear.

In The Dark Knight Rises the traditional batarangs as seen in Batman Begins and The Dark Knight are not shown
but a similar weapon is used. Batman fires miniature bat shaped darts at Bane's henchmen which knock them unconscious.

DC Extended Universe
The Batarang appears in Batman v Superman: Dawn of Justice. In the movie Batman leaves batarangs near crime scenes after he has finished his job as a calling card, for example after he steals kryptonite from Lex Luthor's labs, he leaves a batarang in the place where the kryptonite was stored. He also uses in combat, however rather than disarming criminals, he uses them to stab like a shuriken.
 In Justice League, Wayne throws a Batarang at Barry Allen to show him that he is aware of his super speed, and to reveal his own identity as Batman. Barry quickly dodges and catches it. After Bruce tells Barry that he is putting together a team and Barry says he will join, he asks Bruce if he can keep the Batarang he caught, due to his admiration for it. Batman seems to accept that and allows him to keep it.
 Freddy Freeman owns a replica Batarang in Shazam!, which proves useful as it is thrown at Dr Sivana in the film's climax, wounding him and proving his human vulnerability without the Seven Deadly Sins.

Animation

DC Animated Universe
In Batman: The Animated Series his use of batarangs is ubiquitous. The standard is a serrated crescent shaped. One version attached to a line allowed him to snare criminals as well as ascend and swing from rooftops but he relied on his grappling gun for transportation.

Batman Beyond, another animated series, which takes place 50 years in Gotham City's future, has a young high school student donning a high tech version of the batsuit to become the new Batman. This suit, among many other features, has the ability to automatically load ultra-compact foldable circular batarangs in the wearer's hand or shoot them through the top of the wrist. The batarangs are collapsible and come in a variety of forms including electrical versions to take down Inque, and explosive versions to demolish obstacles.

In the Justice League cartoon series, Batman employed a variety of Batarangs, including explosive Batarangs and electrically charged variants.

Other animated cartoons
In the Teen Titans animated series, Robin uses similar modified batarangs to the adult Nightwing, referred to as birdarangs. The same weapons are used by The Batmans interpretation of Robin. Robin also uses circular Batarang type weapons in the TV series Young Justice.

In the animated series Krypto the Superdog, Robbie the Robin uses comical weapons called beakerangs, which are miniature projectiles that contain a highly exaggerated amount of purple incapacitating foam. Ace the Bat-Hound fires Batarangs from his flying platform.

In The Batman, a later animated series, the batarangs are mostly depicted as futuristic throwing weapons lined with fluorescent blue, and making a distinct humming noise while flying through the air. They are also portrayed as sharp enough to slice through metal pipes. The Batman has from time to time also used them in hand-to-hand combat (in one instance, during the fight with Clayface II, Batman attached a rotating batarang to his wrist, making it a makeshift miniature buzzsaw). Despite the regular batarangs, the Batman uses several other variations, including explosion batarangs, that explode after making contact; electrocuting batarangs, that discharge a strong electric current through a person or object; and, batarangs with a special technological virus, that infects and disables a machine or gadget, making it ineffective. Also, the Batman uses a very special remote-controlled batarang, that is a little larger than the other versions, can adhere to any surface, and has a miniature high-resolution camera. Despite them being futuristic, these batarangs have the most boomerang characteristics, and are shown return to Batman's hand. In The Batman vs. Dracula, Alfred Pennyworth treated some of the batarangs with garlic in preparation of the Dark Knight's battle with Count Dracula.

In Batman: The Brave and the Bold, the batarangs are not shown as high tech futuristic throwing tools like in The Batman, but as simple shuriken/boomerangs that he uses to fight crime (although he has been seen using explosive batarangs, and in the case of the Gentleman Ghost, Nth metal batarangs.) Batman has also been shown to be able to turn his bat symbol into a batarang, as seen the pilot episode, "Rise of the Blue Beetle". Also, Owlman, Batman's parallel universe counterpart, has a similar weapon to the batarang, however, his, instead of spinning at high speeds, fly straight like a glider.

In the series Beware the Batman, the batarangs have a shape similar to the Nolan universe counterpart with bronze and gray coloring. Some are collapsible. Others employ miniaturized scanners allowing Batman to study potentially dangerous objects from afar. Others carry explosive charges.

In Robot Chicken DC Comics Special III: Magical Friendship, in the Robot Chicken DC Universe Batman reveals to Robin that he created a Batarang entirely out of Kryptonite which he planned to use to kill Superman if he ever turned evil as one of the many methods he developed to deal with members of the Justice League if they ever turned evil. Later in the special, Batman stabs the Kryptonian-half of Composite Superman's shoulder with the Kryptonite Batarang to weaken him enough to allow Superman to defeat him with a punch to the groin.

Video games
The Batarang was a primary weapon in Batman: The Caped Crusader. It was used to climb and swing in Batman: The Movie.

Batman: Vengeance features regular and electrified batarangs as throwing weapons.

Lego Batman: The Video Game features batarangs (in two different colors), which can be used by four characters; Batman & Batgirl (black and yellow), and Robin & Nightwing (red and green).

In the Batman Begins video game, Batarangs were only used to interact with the environment, in order to scare henchmen.

The Game Boy Batman game allowed the collection and use of up to 3 Batarangs that could be thrown simultaneously.

Batman: Arkham
In Batman: Arkham Asylum, Batman can wield a single Batarang from the beginning, and the player has the opportunity to unlock multiple variations such as remote-controlled Batarangs and Sonic Batarangs. In addition, the Collector's Edition of the game comes with a 14" plastic Batarang model affixed to a display base.   The Batarang appears in the sequel, Batman: Arkham City, introducing a new variation, a reverse Batarang which can loop behind an enemy and attack from behind. Batman: Arkham Knight, the third and final installment in Rocksteady's Arkham trilogy, also features the batarang with many of the same variants and abilities seen in the previous two games. Batman also has a new Batarang called the Bat Scanner he can throw high into the air around Gotham to scan a specific area.  Toy and prop replica company NECA produced a batarang replica based in the Arkham Knight design, which can be purchased through video game retailer Gamestop. This batarang replica can be folded at its middle hinge and rapidly opened with the press of a button, and also has a removable LED light panel.

References

Further reading
 "Image Schemas and Conceptual Metaphor in Action Comics", Elizabeth Potsch and Robert F. Williams, in Linguistics and the Study of Comics (Palgrave McMillan, 2012) uses the motion of the batarang to demonstrate how the reader interprets the action in a comic panel.
 "Batmobile Gets New Air-Cushion Ride", The Cincinnati Enquirer (May 27, 1966)
 "Batcollection earns money, spot in movie" by Tom Forstrom, Salem Statesman-Journal (March 9, 2003)

External links
IGN: Holy Bat-Gadgets!

Batman objects
Fictional elements introduced in 1939
Throwing weapons